Nerlinger is a German surname. Notable people with the surname include:

Christian Nerlinger (born 1973), German footballer
Manfred Nerlinger (born 1960), German weightlifter, trainer, and entrepreneur
Oskar Nerlinger (1893–1969), German painter

German-language surnames